The National Museum of the Royal Palace (Italian: Museo nazionale di Palazzo Reale) is a museum housed in a former royal palazzo at 46 Lungarno Antonio Pacinotti in Pisa, Italy. The building was designed in 1583 by Bernardo Buontalenti for Francesco I de' Medici and - like the Signoria in Pisa - replaced the Medici palace near the church and monastery of San Matteo. Housing paintings, sculpture, tapestries and decorative arts, since December 2014 the Ministero per i beni e le attività culturali has placed the museum under the control of the Polo museale della Toscana, renamed the Direzione regionale Musei in December 2019.

References

Museums in Pisa
Art museums and galleries in Italy